Thurgood is a one-man play about the life of Thurgood Marshall. It was written by George Stevens, Jr. The show premiered in 2006 at the Westport Country Playhouse, starring James Earl Jones and directed by Leonard Foglia.

The production featured Scenic Design by Allen Moyer, Costume Design by Jane Greenwood, Lighting Design by Brian Nason, Sound Design by Ryan Rumery and Projection Design by Elaine J. McCarthy.
 
The play started on Broadway at the Booth Theatre on April 30, 2008, starring Laurence Fishburne. On February 24, 2011, HBO screened a filmed version of the play which Fishburne had performed at the John F. Kennedy Center for the Performing Arts. The production was described by the Baltimore Sun as "one of the most frank, informed and searing discussions of race you will ever see on TV." On February 16, 2011, a screening of the film was hosted by the White House as part of its celebrations of Black History Month.

Notes

References

External links
The Booth Theatre's production of Thurgood

Plays for one performer
Monodrama
Broadway plays
2007 plays
Biographical plays
Cultural depictions of judges
Plays set in the 1960s
Plays set in the United States
Plays about race and ethnicity
Articles containing video clips
Thurgood Marshall